Drunken monkey hypothesis proposes that human attraction to ethanol may derive from dependence of the primate ancestors of Homo sapiens on ripe and fermenting fruit as a dominant food source. Ethanol naturally occurs in ripe and overripe fruit when yeasts ferment sugars, and consequently early primates (and many other fruit-eating animals) have evolved a genetically based behavioral attraction to the molecule.

This hypothesis was originally proposed by Robert Dudley of the University of California at Berkeley, and was the subject of a symposium at the 2004 annual meeting of the Society for Integrative and Comparative Biology.  His book The Drunken Monkey: Why We Drink and Abuse Alcohol was published in 2014 by the University of California Press.  Dudley suggests that, whereas most addictive substances have a relatively short history of human use, attraction to and consumption of ethanol by various primates may go back tens of millions of years.  The odors of ripening fruit would help primates find scarce calories in tropical rain forests, given that ethanol is a relatively light molecule and is moved rapidly by winds through vegetation.  This once-beneficial attraction to and consumption of ethanol at low concentrations may underlie modern human tendencies for alcohol use and alcohol abuse.

References

External links 
2014 review of the drunken monkey hypothesis
2014 PNAS article reconstructing ancestral hominid enzymes involved in metabolism of dietary ethanol
2008 PNAS paper showing natural attraction of the slow loris and pen-tailed treeshrew to fermenting nectar
Laboratory of Professor Robert Dudley at the University of California, Berkeley

Alcohol abuse
Human evolution